Nowe Miasto (meaning "new town") is a common place-name in Poland.

There are three Polish towns called Nowe Miasto:

 Nowe Miasto, Płońsk County in Masovian Voivodeship (east-central Poland)
 Nowe Miasto Lubawskie in Warmian-Masurian Voivodeship (north-east Poland), seat of Nowe Miasto County
 Nowe Miasto nad Pilicą in Masovian Voivodeship (east-central Poland)

The following (despite the name) is not a town but a village:
 Nowe Miasto nad Wartą in Greater Poland Voivodeship (west-central Poland)

The following are districts or neighbourhoods within cities:

 Nowe Miasto, Białystok
 Nowe Miasto, Kraków, part of the district of Stare Miasto
 Nowe Miasto, Poznań
 Nowe Miasto, Szczecin
 Nowe Miasto, Warsaw
 Nowe Miasto, Wałbrzych

Nowe Miasto may also refer to:

 Nowe Miasto Korczyn, former name of Nowy Korczyn, a town in Świętokrzyskie Voivodeship
 Nowe Miasto, Polish name for Naujamiestis, Panevėžys, town in northern Lithuania
 Nowe Miasto, Polish name for Žemaičių Naumiestis, town in western Lithuania

See also 

 Stare Miasto (disambiguation)